Susan Humphries (born October 31, 1957) is an American politician who has served in the Kansas House of Representatives from the 99th district since 2017. The Butler County Times-Gazette article concerning the announcement of her candidacy says she is an attorney and describes her as a conservative.

References

External links
Susan Humphries Vote Smart

1957 births
Living people
Republican Party members of the Kansas House of Representatives
Kansas lawyers
21st-century American politicians
21st-century American women politicians
Women state legislators in Kansas
Texas Christian University alumni
Sturm College of Law alumni